The 42nd International Film Festival of India was held on 23 to 30 November 2011 in Goa. The International competition (Feature) was chaired by Adoor Gopalakrishnan, and Short film competition was chaired by Basu Bhattacharya. For the first time the 42d IFFI had launched its own poster with a depiction of fest motif "Peacock", made as a "dancing peacock" by veteran film design and art consultant Thotta Tharani. The IFFI signature film was conceptualized by veteran film maker Shaji Karun. New sections such as “Kaleidoscope”, 3 D, Animation, European discoveries, Master Classes and Russian Classics were included, along with the inaugural Best Director Award. Indian actor Shah Rukh Khan was the chief guest for the festival.

Winners
Golden Peacock (Best Film):  "Porfirio" by "Alejandro Landes"
IFFI Best Director Award: Asghar Farhadi for "A Separation"
IFFI Best Actor Award (Male): Silver Peacock Award: Sasson Gabai  for "Restoration"
IFFI Best Actor Award (Female): Silver Peacock Award: Nadezhda Markina for "Elena"
Silver Peacock Special Jury Award: Salim Ahamed for "Adaminte Makan Abu"

Special Awards
Life Time Achievement Award - "Bertrand Tavernier"

Awards for Short Films
Vasudha award for “A Pestering Journey” by K. R. Manoj 
Second prize of Golden Lamp Tree:  “Another Planet” by Smita Bhide 
Silver Lamp Tree award: “Crazy Beats Strong Every Time’ by Mool Monson
International Jury Prize: “Khule Darwaze” by Ashish Pande
Special Jury Prize: "Anthony Gonsolves" by Ashok Rane.

Official selections

Special screenings

Opening film
“The Lady” by Luc Besson

Closing film
"The Consul of Bordeaux” by Francisco Manso and Joao Correa

References

External links
 

2011 film festivals
2011 festivals in Asia
International Film Festival of India
2011 in Indian cinema